Group B of the 2003 FIFA Confederations Cup took place between 19 and 23 June 2003. Cameroon won the group, and advanced to the knockout stage, along with group runners-up Turkey. Brazil and United States failed to advance.

Standings

Results

Turkey v United States

Brazil v Cameroon

Cameroon v Turkey

Brazil v United States

Brazil v Turkey

United States v Cameroon

References

B
2002–03 in Turkish football
Brazil at the 2003 FIFA Confederations Cup
2003 in American soccer
2003 in Cameroonian football